Bangplub Don Army Football Club (Thai สโมสรฟุตบอลบางพลับ ดอนทหารบก), is a Thai football club based in Nonthaburi, Thailand. The club is currently playing in the 2017 Thailand Amateur League Bangkok Metropolitan Region.

Record

References
 104 ทีมร่วมชิงชัย! แบโผผลจับสลาก ดิวิชั่น 3 ฤดูกาล 2016
 Bangplub news

External links
 Facebook Page

Association football clubs established in 2015
Football clubs in Thailand
Sport in Nonthaburi province
2015 establishments in Thailand